Afghanistan International (AITV) is a Dari Persian language television station headquartered in London, UK. The station broadcasts free-to-air on the TürkmenÄlem 52°E / MonacoSAT satellite receivable in Europe and Asia including Afghanistan, along with a radio relay transmission via shortwave (7600 kHz). It also broadcasts worldwide via online streaming platforms.

History
Afghanistan International TV was launched on August 15, 2021. Originally planned to start on International Day of Peace, it was launched earlier due to the situation in Afghanistan amid the Taliban's capture of Kabul and quickly became the most popular news channel for Afghanistan due to its extensive coverage and freedom in reporting. Its flagship program Maydan brings in top policy makers and thinkers from across the world to London to discuss Afghanistan current affairs. It has journalists in both London and Washington D.C. in the United States providing news and current affairs. AITV is a sister station of Iran International.

References

External links
Afghanistan International tv Live

Television channels and stations established in 2021
Television channels in the United Kingdom
Persian-language television stations